Sharon Berry  is the founder and CEO of the UK non-profit charity Storybook Dads.

References

Women chief executives
Living people
Officers of the Order of the British Empire
Year of birth missing (living people)
Place of birth missing (living people)